Millersville is a borough in Lancaster County, Pennsylvania, United States. At the 2020 census the population was 7,629 and in 2021 it was estimated at 7,593.

Geography
Millersville is located in central Lancaster County at  (40.006148, -76.351349).

A small portion of the southern border of the borough touches the Conestoga River, a tributary of the Susquehanna. Millersville University is in the southern part of the borough.

Demographics

At the 2000 census there were 7,774 people, 2,335 households, and 1,272 families living in the borough. The population density was 3,811.4 people per square mile (1,471.4/km²). There were 2,469 housing units at an average density of 1,210.5 per square mile (467.3/km²).  The racial makeup of the borough was 92.45% White, 4.31% African American, 0.06% Native American, 1.12% Asian, 0.08% Pacific Islander, 0.98% from other races, and 1.00% from two or more races. Hispanic or Latino of any race were 2.55%.

There were 2,335 households, 19.4% had children under the age of 18 living with them, 45.4% were married couples living together, 6.6% had a female householder with no husband present, and 45.5% were non-families. 29.7% of households were made up of individuals, and 14.5% were one person aged 65 or older. The average household size was 2.27 and the average family size was 2.74.

The age distribution was 10.9% under the age of 18, 45.0% from 18 to 24, 15.4% from 25 to 44, 13.9% from 45 to 64, and 14.9% 65 or older. The median age was 22 years. For every 100 females, there were 83.7 males. For every 100 females age 18 and over, there were 82.1 males.

The median household income was $38,425 and the median family income  was $53,110. Males had a median income of $36,327 versus $25,636 for females. The per capita income for the borough was $15,773. About 3.7% of families and 16.4% of the population were below the poverty line, including 10.2% of those under age 18 and 6.8% of those age 65 or over.

History 

Originally farmland in then Manor Township owned by John Miller, Millerstown was a crossroads for goods and sales brought from the local farming communities into Lancaster City. Later the town's name was changed to "Millersville", and it was incorporated as a separate borough in Lancaster County. Millersville is the location of the first teachers' academy in the state, established in 1854. Later, in 1855, it was chartered as a state normal school. Today, the college is Millersville University, which is part of the Pennsylvania State System of Higher Education.

Notable residents
Marijane Landis (1928–2015), television producer and host (WGAL-TV); creator of the children's television shows Percy Platypus and His Friends (1955–1974) and Sunshine Corners (1974–1979)

References

External links 

 

 
Populated places established in 1764
Boroughs in Lancaster County, Pennsylvania
1764 establishments in Pennsylvania